Brown bulbul may refer to species in the bulbul family of birds:

 Asian red-eyed bulbul (Pycnonotus brunneus), found in south-eastern Asia
 Common bulbul (Pycnonotus barbatus), found in Africa

Birds by common name